Poľný Kesov is a village and municipality in the Nitra District in western central Slovakia, in the Nitra Region.

History
In historical records the village was first mentioned in 1113.

Geography
The village lies at an altitude of 172 metres and covers an area of 10.224 km². It has a population of about 615 people.

Ethnicity
The population is about 99% Slovak.

References

External links
http://www.statistics.sk/mosmis/eng/run.html

Villages and municipalities in Nitra District